Stephen Sheehi is an American Middle East studies scholar of Lebanese origin. He is a professor of Arabic Studies and the Sultan Qaboos bin Said Chair of Middle East Studies at the College of William & Mary.

Works
 Foundations of Modern Arab Identity (University of Florida, 2004)
 Islamophobia: The Ideological Campaign Against Muslims (Atlanta: Clarity Press, 2011)
 The Arab Imago: A Social History of Indigenous Photography 1860-1910 (Princeton University Press, 2016)
 Psychoanalysis Under Occupation: Practicing Resistance in Palestine (Routledge, 2022)
 Camera Palaestina: Photography and Displaced Histories of Palestine (University of California, 2022)

References

College of William & Mary faculty
Living people
Middle Eastern studies scholars
Year of birth missing (living people)